Giles O'Grady is a Gaelic footballer and hurler from Ballyduff in County Kerry, Ireland.

References

External links
http://www.sportsfile.com/id/086688/
http://www.sportsfile.com/id/086690/
http://www.sportsfile.com/id/325388/
http://www.sportsfile.com/id/291652/

Year of birth missing (living people)
Living people
Ballyduff (Kerry) Gaelic footballers
Ballyduff (Kerry) hurlers
Dual players
Kerins O'Rahilly's Gaelic footballers
Kerry inter-county Gaelic footballers
Kerry inter-county hurlers